The West Indian Court of Appeal (WICA) was a court which served as the appellate court for the British colonies of Trinidad and Tobago, British Guiana, Barbados, the Leeward Islands, Grenada, Saint Lucia, and Saint Vincent from 1919 until the creation of the Federal Supreme Court of the West Indies Federation in 1958.

The court was created by the West Indian Court of Appeal Act 1919, an Act of the Parliament of the United Kingdom. Decisions of the court could be appealed with leave to the Judicial Committee of the Privy Council.

Defunct courts
1919 establishments in North America
1919 establishments in the British Empire
1958 disestablishments in the British Empire
British Guiana
British Trinidad and Tobago
History of the Colony of Barbados
British Leeward Islands
British Grenada
British Saint Lucia
British Saint Vincent and the Grenadines
Appellate courts
1958 disestablishments in North America
Courts and tribunals established in 1919
Courts and tribunals disestablished in 1958